Tariq Mansoor (born 20 September 1956) is an Indian academic and professor, who is currently serving as the vice-chancellor of the Aligarh Muslim University in India since 17 May 2017.

Biography
He was previously a professor at the Jawaharlal Nehru Medical College, Aligarh in the Department of Surgery.

After the release of BBC documentary named India: The Modi Question, Mansoor criticized the BBC for its "agenda-driven journalism", ."

References 

Living people
1956 births
Heads of universities and colleges in India
Uttar Pradesh academics
Aligarh Muslim University alumni
Academic staff of Aligarh Muslim University
Vice-Chancellors of the Aligarh Muslim University